The Montreal Canadiens, officially  ( The Canadian Hockey Club) and colloquially known as the Habs, are a professional ice hockey team based in Montreal. They compete in the National Hockey League (NHL) as a member of the Atlantic Division of the Eastern Conference. Since 1996, the Canadiens have played their home games at Bell Centre, originally known as Molson Centre. The team previously played at the Montreal Forum, which housed the team for seven decades and all but their first two Stanley Cup championships.

Founded in 1909, the Canadiens are the longest continuously operating professional ice hockey team worldwide, and the only existing NHL club to predate the founding of the NHL. One of the oldest North American professional sports franchises, the Canadiens' history predates that of every other Canadian franchise outside football, as well as every American franchise outside baseball and the National Football League's Arizona Cardinals. The franchise is one of the "Original Six", the teams that made up the NHL from 1942 until the 1967 expansion. The team's championship season in 1992–93 marked the last time a Canadian team won the Stanley Cup.

The Canadiens have won the Stanley Cup more times than any other franchise, having earned 24 championships, with 23 victories since the founding of the NHL, and 22 since 1927, when NHL teams became the only ones to compete for the Stanley Cup. The Canadiens also had the most championships by a team of any of the four major North American sports until the New York Yankees won their 25th World Series title in 1999.

History

The Canadiens were founded by J. Ambrose O'Brien on December 4, 1909, as a charter member of the National Hockey Association,
the forerunner to the National Hockey League. It was to be the team of the francophone community in Montreal, composed of francophone players, and under francophone ownership as soon as possible. The founders named the team "Les Canadiens," a term identified at the time with French speakers. The team's first season was not a success, as they placed last in the league. After the first year, ownership was transferred to George Kennedy of Montreal and the team's record improved over the next seasons. The team won its first Stanley Cup championship in the 1915–16 season. In 1917, with four other NHA teams, the Canadiens formed the NHL, and they won their first NHL Stanley Cup during the 1923–24 season, led by Howie Morenz. The team moved from the Mount Royal Arena to the Montreal Forum for the 1926–27 season.

The club began the 1930s decade successfully, with Stanley Cup wins in 1930 and 1931. The Canadiens and its then-Montreal rival, the Montreal Maroons, declined both on the ice and economically during the Great Depression. Losses grew to the point where the team owners considered selling the team to interests in Cleveland, Ohio, though local investors were ultimately found to finance the Canadiens. The Maroons suspended operations, and several of their players moved to the Canadiens.

Led by the "Punch Line" of Maurice "Rocket" Richard, Toe Blake and Elmer Lach in the 1940s, the Canadiens enjoyed success again atop the NHL. From 1953 to 1960, the franchise won six Stanley Cups, including a record five straight from 1956 to 1960, with a new set of stars coming to prominence: Jean Beliveau, Dickie Moore, Doug Harvey, Bernie "Boom Boom" Geoffrion, Jacques Plante and Richard's younger brother, Henri.

The Canadiens added ten more championships in 15 seasons from 1965 to 1979, with another dynastic run of four-straight Cups from 1976 to 1979. In the 1976–77 season, the Canadiens set two still-standing team records – for most points, with 132, and fewest losses, by only losing eight games in an 80-game season. The next season, 1977–78, the team had a 28-game unbeaten streak, the second-longest in NHL history. The next generation of stars included Guy Lafleur, Yvan Cournoyer, Ken Dryden, Pete Mahovlich, Jacques Lemaire, Pierre Larouche, Steve Shutt, Bob Gainey, Serge Savard, Guy Lapointe and Larry Robinson. Scotty Bowman, who would later set a record for most NHL victories by a coach, was the team's head coach for its last five Stanley Cup victories in the 1970s.

The Canadiens won Stanley Cups in 1986, led by rookie star goaltender Patrick Roy, and in 1993, continuing their streak of winning at least one championship in every decade from the 1910s to the 1990s (this streak came to an end in the 2000s). In 1996, the Habs moved from the Montreal Forum, their home during 70 seasons and 22 Stanley Cups, to Molson Centre (now called Bell Centre).

Following Roy's departure in 1995, the Canadiens fell into an extended stretch of mediocrity, missing the playoffs in four of their next ten seasons and failing to advance past the second round of the playoffs until 2010. By the late 1990s, with both an ailing team and monetary losses exacerbated by a record-low value of the Canadian dollar, Montreal fans feared their team would end up relocated to the United States. Team owner Molson Brewery sold control of the franchise and the Molson Centre to American businessman George N. Gillett Jr. in 2001, with the right of first refusal for any future sale by Gillett and a condition that the NHL Board of Governors must unanimously approve any attempt to move to a new city. Led by club president Pierre Boivin, the Canadiens returned to being a lucrative enterprise, earning additional revenues from broadcasting and arena events. In 2009, Gillett sold the franchise to a consortium led by the Molson family which included The Woodbridge Company, BCE/Bell, the Fonds de solidarité FTQ, Michael Andlauer, Luc Bertrand and the National Bank Financial Group for $575 million, more than double the $275 million he spent on the purchase eight years prior.

During the 2008–09 season, the Canadiens celebrated their 100th anniversary with various events,
including hosting both the 2009 NHL All-Star Game,
and the 2009 NHL Entry Draft.
The Canadiens became the first team in NHL history to reach 3,000 victories with their 5–2 victory over the Florida Panthers on December 29, 2008.

For the 2020–21 season, the league moved the Canadiens along with the other six teams from Canada to the North Division. Due to the COVID-19 pandemic, the Canadiens only played against teams in the division in the regular season to avoid travel restrictions between the United States and Canada. All teams in the division played without fans to begin the season. The Canadiens advanced through the 2021 Stanley Cup playoffs, beating the Toronto Maple Leafs in the first round of the playoffs 4–3, overcoming a 3–1 Maple Leafs lead in the series. The Canadiens then swept the Winnipeg Jets in the second round, advancing to the Stanley Cup semifinals. The Canadiens defeated the Vegas Golden Knights in the semifinals, clinching an overtime victory in Game 6 of the series, and reaching their first Stanley Cup Finals in 28 years, whilst also being the first Canadian team to reach the Finals since the Vancouver Canucks in 2011. Montreal lost the Finals to the Tampa Bay Lightning, 4 games to 1.

In 2021–22, the Canadiens were unable to replicate their success from the prior season, ultimately finishing last in the league for the first time since the 1939–40 season and the first time in the NHL's expansion era, in what was one of the worst seasons in the team's history. In the process they set team records for most regulation losses (49), most goals against (319), fewest wins (22), and fewest points (55), while their .335 point percentage was the team's third-worst ever, after only 1925–26 (.319) and 1939–40 (.260).

Team identity

The Canadiens organization operates in both English and French. For many years, public address announcements and press releases have been given in both languages, and the team website and social media outlets are in both languages as well. At home games, the first stanza of O Canada is sung in French, and the chorus is sung in English.

Crest and sweater design

One of sport's oldest and most recognizable logos, the classic 'C' and 'H' of the Montreal Canadiens was first used together in the 1917–18 season, when the club changed its name to "Club de hockey Canadien" from "Club athlétique Canadien", before evolving to its current form in 1952–53. The "H" stands for "hockey", not "Habitants," a popular misconception. According to NHL.com, the first man to refer to the team as "the Habs" was American Tex Rickard, owner of the Madison Square Garden, in 1924. Rickard apparently told a reporter that the "H" on the Canadiens' sweaters was for "Habitants". In French, the "Habitants" nickname dates back to at least 1914, when it was printed in Le Devoir to report a 9–3 win over Toronto on the ninth of February.

The team's colours since 1911 are blue, white and red. The home sweater is predominantly red in colour. There are four blue and white stripes, one across each arm, one across the chest and the other across the waistline. The main road sweater is mainly white with a red and blue stripe across the waist, red at the end of both arm sleeves red shoulder yokes. The basic design has been in use since 1914 and took its current form in 1925, generally evolving as materials changed.

Since 2015, the Canadiens' home red sweater is the only uniform in the league to feature the French language version of the NHL shield logo (LNH) on the neck collar, in acknowledgment of Montreal's French Canadian heritage. The road white sweater retains the English NHL shield logo.

The Canadiens used multiple designs prior to adopting the aforementioned design in 1914. The original shirt of the 1909–10 season was blue with a white C. The second season had a red shirt featuring a green maple leaf with the C logo, and green pants. Lastly, the season before adopting the current look the Canadiens wore a "barber pole" design jersey with red, white and blue stripes, and the logo being a white maple leaf reading "CAC", "Club athlétique Canadien". All three designs were worn during the 2009–10 season as part of the Canadiens centenary.

In the 2020–21 season, the Canadiens unveiled a "Reverse Retro" alternate uniform in collaboration with Adidas. The uniform was essentially the same as their regular red uniform, but with blue as the primary colour and red as the stripe colour. A second "Reverse Retro" uniform was released in the 2022–23 season, again using the same template but with red relegated to the logo only and featuring a light blue base with white/dark blue/white stripes.

The Canadiens' colours are a readily identifiable aspect of French Canadian culture. In the short story "The Hockey Sweater", Roch Carrier described the influence of the Canadiens and their jersey within rural Quebec communities during the 1940s.
The story was later made into an animated short, The Sweater, narrated by Carrier.
A passage from the short story appears on the 2002 issue of the Canadian five-dollar bill.

Motto
Nos bras meurtris vous tendent le flambeau, à vous toujours de le porter bien haut.
To you from failing hands we throw the torch. Be yours to hold it high.

The motto is from the poem "In Flanders Fields" by John McCrae, which was written in 1915, the year before the Canadiens won their first Stanley Cup championship. The motto appears on the wall of the Canadiens' dressing room as well as on the inside collar of the new Adidas 2017–18 jerseys.

Mascot

Beginning in the 2004–05 NHL season, the Canadiens adopted Youppi! as their official mascot, the first costumed mascot in their long history. Youppi was the longtime mascot for the Montreal Expos baseball team but was dropped from the franchise when they moved to Washington, D.C. in 2004–05 and became the Washington Nationals. With the switch, Youppi became the first mascot in professional sports to switch leagues. He is also the first mascot in professional sports to get ejected from a game. In June 2020, Youppi became the first mascot from a Canadian-based club to be honoured in The Mascot Hall of Fame. Youppi's induction in the Mascot Hall of Fame was decided by a long voting process, which included the public vote.

In 2022, the Canadiens introduced an "unofficial official mascot" for its Reverse Retro series of games that season.

Rivalries

The Canadiens have developed strong rivalries with two fellow Original Six franchises, with whom they frequently shared divisions and competed in postseason play. The oldest is with the Toronto Maple Leafs, who first faced the Canadiens as the Toronto Arenas in 1917. The teams met 16 times in the playoffs, including five Stanley Cup Finals. Featuring the two largest cities in Canada and two of the largest fanbases in the league, the rivalry is sometimes dramatized as being emblematic of Canada's English and French linguistic divide. From 1938 to 1970, they were the only two Canadian teams in the league.

The team's other Original Six rival are the Boston Bruins, who since their NHL debut in 1924 have played the Canadiens more than any other team in both regular season play and the playoffs combined. The teams have played 34 playoff series, seven of which were in the finals.

The Canadiens also had an intraprovincial rivalry with the Quebec Nordiques during its existence from 1979 to 1995, nicknamed the "Battle of Quebec."

Broadcasting

Montreal Canadiens games are broadcast locally in both the French and English languages. CHMP 98.5 is the Canadiens' French-language radio flagship. As of the 2017–18 season, the team's regional television in both languages, and its English-language radio rights, are held by Bell Media. CKGM, TSN Radio 690, is the English-language radio flagship; it acquired the rights under a seven-year deal which began in the 2011–12 season. In June 2017, Bell Media reached a five-year extension.

Regional television rights in French are held by Réseau des sports (RDS) under a 12-year deal that began in the 2014–15 NHL season. A sister to the English-language network TSN, RDS was the only French-language sports channel in Canada until the 2011 launch of TVA Sports, and was also the previous national French rightsholder of the NHL; as a result, the Canadiens forwent a separate regional contract, and allowed all of its games to be televised nationally in French as part of RDS's overall NHL rights.

With TVA Sports becoming the national French rightsholder in the 2014–15 season through a sub-licensing agreement with Sportsnet, RDS subsequently announced a 12-year deal to maintain regional rights to Canadiens games not shown on TVA Sports. As a result, games on RDS are blacked out outside the Canadiens' home market of Quebec, Atlantic Canada and parts of Eastern Ontario shared with the Ottawa Senators. At least 22 Canadiens games per season (primarily through its Saturday night La super soirée LNH), including all playoff games, are televised nationally by TVA Sports.

TSN2 assumed the English-language regional television rights in the 2017–18 season, with John Bartlett on play-by-play, and Dave Poulin, Mike Johnson and Craig Button on colour commentary. All other games, including all playoff games, are televised nationally by Sportsnet or CBC. Bartlett returned to Sportsnet over the 2018 off-season, and was succeeded by Bryan Mudryk.

English-language regional rights were previously held by Sportsnet East (with CJNT City Montreal as an overflow channel), under a 3-year deal that expired after the 2016–17 season; the games were called by Bartlett and Jason York. Prior to this deal, TSN held the rights from 2010 through 2014; the games were broadcast on a part-time channel with Dave Randorf on play-by-play.

Season-by-season record
This is a list of the last five seasons completed by the Canadiens. For the full season-by-season history, see List of Montreal Canadiens seasons.

Note: GP = Games played, W = Wins, L = Losses, T = Ties, OTL = Overtime Losses, Pts = Points, GF = Goals for, GA = Goals against

Players and personnel

Current roster

Honoured members

Retired numbers

The Canadiens have retired 15 numbers in honour of 18 players, the most of any team in the NHL. All honourees were born in Canada and were members of at least two Stanley Cup winning Canadiens teams. Howie Morenz was the first honouree, on November 2, 1937. The NHL retired Wayne Gretzky's No. 99 for all its member teams at the 2000 NHL All-Star Game.

Hockey Hall of Fame
The Montreal Canadiens have an affiliation with a number of inductees to the Hockey Hall of Fame. Sixty-five inductees from the players category are affiliated with the Canadiens. Thirty-seven of these players are from three separate notable dynasties: 12 from 1955 to 1960, 11 from 1964 to 1969, and 13 from 1975 to 1979. Howie Morenz and Georges Vezina were the first Canadiens given the honour in 1945, while Guy Carbonneau was the most recently inducted, in 2019. Along with players, a number of inductees from the builders category are affiliated with the club. The first inductee was Vice-President William Northey in 1945. The most recent inductee was Pat Burns in 2014.

In addition to players and builders, five broadcasters for the Montreal Canadiens were also awarded the Foster Hewitt Memorial Award from the Hockey Hall of Fame. The first two recipients of the award were Danny Gallivan and Rene Lecavalier in 1984. The other three award recipients include Doug Smith (1985), Dick Irvin Jr. (1988), and Gilles Tremblay (2002).

Team captains

 Jack Laviolette, 1909–1910, 1911–1912
 Newsy Lalonde, 1910–1911, 1912–1913, 1916–1922
 Jimmy Gardner, 1913–1915
 Howard McNamara, 1915–1916
 Sprague Cleghorn, 1922–1925
 Billy Coutu, 1925–1926
 Sylvio Mantha, 1926–1932, 1933–1936
 George Hainsworth, 1932–1933
 Albert "Babe" Siebert, 1936–1939
 Walter Buswell, 1939–1940
 Toe Blake, 1940–1948
 Bill Durnan, 1948 (January–April)
 Emile Bouchard, 1948–1956
 Maurice Richard, 1956–1960
 Doug Harvey, 1960–1961
 Jean Beliveau, 1961–1971
 Henri Richard, 1971–1975
 Yvan Cournoyer, 1975–1979
 Serge Savard, 1979–1981
 Bob Gainey, 1981–1989
 Guy Carbonneau and Chris Chelios, 1989–1990 (co-captains)
 Guy Carbonneau, 1990–1994
 Kirk Muller, 1994–1995
 Mike Keane, 1995 (April–December)
 Pierre Turgeon, 1995–1996
 Vincent Damphousse, 1996–1999
 Saku Koivu, 1999–2009
 Brian Gionta, 2010–2014
 Max Pacioretty, 2015–2018
 Shea Weber, 2018–2022
 Nick Suzuki, 2022–present

Head coaches

 Joe Cattarinich and Jack Laviolette, 1909–1910
 Adolphe Lecours, 1911
 Napoleon Dorval, 1911–1913
 Jimmy Gardner, 1913–1915
 Newsy Lalonde, 1915–1921, 1932–1934
 Leo Dandurand, 1921–1926
 Cecil Hart, 1926–1932, 1936–1938
 Newsy Lalonde and Leo Dandurand, 1934–1935
 Sylvio Mantha, 1935–1936
 Cecil Hart and Jules Dugal, 1938–1939
 Albert "Babe" Siebert, 1939
 Alfred "Pit" Lepine, 1939–1940
 Dick Irvin, 1940–55
 Hector "Toe" Blake, 1955–1968
 Claude Ruel, 1968–1970, 1979–1981
 Al MacNeil, 1970–1971
 Scotty Bowman, 1971–1979
 Bernie Geoffrion, 1979
 Bob Berry, 1981–1984
 Jacques Lemaire, 1984–1985
 Jean Perron, 1985–1988
 Pat Burns, 1988–1992
 Jacques Demers, 1992–1995
 Mario Tremblay, 1995–1997
 Alain Vigneault, 1997–2000
 Michel Therrien, 2000–2003, 2012–2017
 Claude Julien, 2003–2006, 2017–2021
 Bob Gainey, 2006 (January–May) 2009 (March–June) (interim)
 Guy Carbonneau, 2006–2009
 Jacques Martin, 2009–2011
 Randy Cunneyworth, 2011–2012 (interim)
 Dominique Ducharme, 2021–2022
 Martin St. Louis, 2022–present

Source:

First-round draft picks

 1963: Garry Monahan (1st overall)
 1964: Claude Chagnon (6th overall)
 1965: Pierre Bouchard (5th overall)
 1966: Phil Myre (5th overall)
 1967: Elgin McCann (8th overall)
 1968: Michel Plasse (1st overall), Roger Belisle (2nd overall), and Jim Pritchard (3rd overall)
 1969: Rejean Houle (1st overall), and Marc Tardif (2nd overall)
 1970: Ray Martynuik (5th overall), and Chuck Lefley (6th overall)
 1971: Guy Lafleur (1st overall), Chuck Arnason (7th overall), and Murray Wilson (11th overall)
 1972: Steve Shutt (4th overall), Michel Larocque (6th overall), Dave Gardner (8th overall), and John Van Boxmeer (14th overall)
 1973: Bob Gainey (8th overall)
 1974: Cam Connor (5th overall), Doug Risebrough (7th overall), Rick Chartraw (10th overall), Mario Tremblay (12th overall), and Gord McTavish (15th overall)
 1975: Robin Sadler (9th overall), and Pierre Mondou (15th overall)
 1976: Peter Lee (12th overall), Rod Schutt (13th overall), and Bruce Baker (18th overall)
 1977: Mark Napier (10th overall), and Norm Dupont (18th overall)
 1978: Danny Geoffrion (8th overall), and Dave Hunter (17th overall)
 1979: None
 1980: Doug Wickenheiser (1st overall)
 1981: Mark Hunter (7th overall), Gilbert Delorme (18th overall), and Jan Ingman (19th overall)
 1982: Alain Heroux (19th overall)
 1983: Alfie Turcotte (17th overall)
 1984: Petr Svoboda (5th overall), and Shayne Corson (8th overall)
 1985: Jose Charbonneau (12th overall), and Tom Chorske (16th overall)
 1986: Mark Pederson (15th overall)
 1987: Andrew Cassels (17th overall)
 1988: Eric Charron (20th overall)
 1989: Lindsay Vallis (13th overall)
 1990: Turner Stevenson (12th overall)
 1991: Brent Bilodeau (17th overall)
 1992: David Wilkie (20th overall)
 1993: Saku Koivu (21st overall)
 1994: Brad Brown (18th overall)
 1995: Terry Ryan (8th overall)
 1996: Matt Higgins (18th overall)
 1997: Jason Ward (11th overall)
 1998: Eric Chouinard (16th overall)
 1999: None
 2000: Ron Hainsey (13th overall) and Marcel Hossa (16th overall)
 2001: Mike Komisarek (7th overall), and Alexander Perezhogin (25th overall)
 2002: Chris Higgins (14th overall)
 2003: Andrei Kostitsyn (10th overall)
 2004: Kyle Chipchura (18th overall)
 2005: Carey Price (5th overall)
 2006: David Fischer (20th overall)
 2007: Ryan McDonagh (12th overall), and Max Pacioretty (22nd overall)
 2008: None
 2009: Louis Leblanc (18th overall)
 2010: Jarred Tinordi (22nd overall)
 2011: Nathan Beaulieu (17th overall)
 2012: Alex Galchenyuk (3rd overall)
 2013: Michael McCarron (25th overall)
 2014: Nikita Scherbak (26th overall)
 2015: Noah Juulsen (26th overall)
 2016: Mikhail Sergachev (9th overall)
 2017: Ryan Poehling (25th overall)
 2018: Jesperi Kotkaniemi (3rd overall)
 2019: Cole Caufield (15th overall)
 2020: Kaiden Guhle (16th overall)
 2021: Logan Mailloux (31st overall)
 2022: Juraj Slafkovsky (1st overall), and Filip Mesar (26th overall)

Franchise individual records

Franchise scoring leaders
These are the top-ten-point-scorers in franchise history. Figures are updated after each completed NHL regular season.
  – current Canadiens player
Note: Pos = Position; GP = Games Played; G = Goals; A = Assists; Pts = Points; P/G = Points per game

Sources: ,

Records – skaters
Career

 Most seasons: 20, Henri Richard
 Most games: 1,256, Henri Richard
 Most goals: 544, Maurice Richard
 Most assists: 728, Guy Lafleur
 Most points: 1,246, Guy Lafleur
 Most penalty minutes: 2,248, Chris Nilan
 Most consecutive games played: 560, Doug Jarvis

Season

 Most goals in a season: 60, Steve Shutt (1976–77); Guy Lafleur (1977–78)
 Most powerplay goals in a season: 20, Yvan Cournoyer (1966–67)
 Most powerplay goals in a season, defenceman: 19, Sheldon Souray (2006–07)*
 Most assists in a season: 82, Pete Mahovlich (1974–75)
 Most points in a season: 136, Guy Lafleur (1976–77)
 Most penalty minutes in a season: 358, Chris Nilan (1984–85)
 Most points in a season, defenceman: 85, Larry Robinson (1976–77)
 Most points in a season, rookie: 71, Mats Naslund (1982–83); Kjell Dahlin (1985–86)
 Most goals in a season, defenceman: 28, Guy Lapointe (1974–75)

* Indicates a league record.

Source:

Records – goaltenders
Career

 Most games played: 707, Carey Price
 Most seasons: 16, Georges Vezina
 Most shutouts: 75, George Hainsworth
 Most wins: 360, Carey Price

Season

 Most games in a season: 72, Carey Price (2010–11)
 Most wins in a season: 44, Carey Price (2014–15)
 Most shutouts in a season: 22, George Hainsworth (1928–29)*

* Indicates a league record.

Source:

See also
 Bell Sports Complex
 List of Montreal Canadiens award winners
 List of Montreal Canadiens general managers
 List of Montreal Canadiens goaltenders
 List of Montreal Canadiens presidents
 Montreal Junior Canadiens

Notes

References

Bibliography

External links

 
 Official historical website of the Montreal Canadiens
 CBC Digital Archives: Montreal Canadiens at 100
 Centre Bell
 Bell Sports Complex

 
National Hockey League teams
1909 establishments in Quebec
Atlantic Division (NHL)
Events of National Historic Significance (Canada)
Ice hockey clubs established in 1909
Can
National Hockey Association teams
National Hockey League in Quebec
National Hockey League teams based in Canada